The Women's T20 Cup is a women's domestic Twenty20 competition organised by Zimbabwe Cricket. The competition began in the 2020–21 season, and sees four teams competing.

Eagles are the current holders, having won both editions of the tournament. The competition runs alongside the Fifty50 Challenge.

History
The tournament began in October 2020, running alongside the Fifty50 Challenge. The inception of the tournament was described by its founders, Zimbabwe Cricket, as "historic", becoming the first domestic women's competition to be played in Zimbabwe since the 2008–09 Inter-Provincial Tournament, which was the only previous such tournament.

The tournament saw four teams, Eagles, Mountaineers, Rhinos and Tuskers compete in a double round-robin group stage, with the top two sides qualifying for the final. Eagles won the group with four wins, and went on to win the tournament, beating Tuskers in the final.

The second edition took place in March 2022, with the same format and teams competing. Eagles once again won the tournament, winning the group stage with four wins before beating Mountaineers in the final.

The third edition of the tournament began in February 2023.

Teams

Results

See also
 Fifty50 Challenge
 Stanbic Bank 20 Series

References

Women's T20 Cup
Zimbabwean domestic cricket competitions
Women's cricket competitions in Zimbabwe
Recurring sporting events established in 2020
Twenty20 cricket leagues